Travis Paulson (born May 11, 1985) is an American freestyle wrestler who formerly competed at 74 kg for the United States of America.

Biography 
Paulson wrestled for Lewis Central High School in Council Bluffs, Iowa during his high school career. He was a three-time Iowa high school state champion (1999, 2001, 2002). After high school, Paulson attended Iowa State University and was a three-time All-American, including a career-best fifth-place finish at 165 pounds at the 2007 NCAA Wrestling National Championship.

Internationally, Paulson finished first at the United States World Team Trials in 2010, and finished with an 0-1 record at the 2010 World Wrestling Championships. He then would go on to lose at the United States 2012 Olympics team trials finals to Jake Herbert.

References 

1985 births
Living people
Iowa State Cyclones wrestlers
People from Council Bluffs, Iowa